The Charlie Horse Music Pizza is an American children's television show that was shown on PBS Kids in the United States from January 5, 1998, to January 17, 1999, with reruns continuing to air until September 5, 1999. Reruns again aired on PBJ until 2016. It is the short-lived spin-off of Lamb Chop's Play-Along and was hosted by Shari Lewis, whose strong belief in the benefits of music education for children led to the creation of the series. Just like Play-Along, The Charlie Horse Music Pizza was shot at the CBC Studios in Vancouver, British Columbia, Canada. The Charlie Horse Music Pizza was Shari's final project.

Plot
The show takes place around a pizzeria on the beach. Alongside the original cast of Lamb Chop, Hush Puppy, Charlie Horse, and Lewis, Charlie Horse Music Pizza introduced five new characters. Take Out, a big anthropomorphized dim-witted orangutan who makes deliveries on roller skates (played by Chancz Perry); Fingers, a giant, sassy purple raccoon that lives in the dumpster behind the pizzeria (played by Gordon Robertson); Cookie, the soft-hearted opera loving cook (played by Dom DeLuise), Junior, a cool teenager who works at the pizzeria part time and plays the tuba for his high school marching band (played by Wezley Morris), and Holly, a young girl in a wheelchair (played by Chantal Strand).

Episodes

Season 1 (1998)

Season 2 (1999)

Cancellation
When Lamb Chop's Play-Along! ended, Shari and her husband Jeremy created The Charlie Horse Music Pizza to teach children about music after talking about what kids loved the most. Because a third of elementary schools were cutting music class from their curriculum at the time, Shari and Jeremy felt that they should introduce kids to music through the show. After Shari was diagnosed with inoperable uterine cancer, the show was put on hold on June 18, 1998, while she underwent chemotherapy at Cedars-Sinai Hospital. She died from viral pneumonia on August 2, 1998. After her death, The Charlie Horse Music Pizza was cancelled. The last episode of The Charlie Horse Music Pizza aired on January 17, 1999, on what would have been her 66th birthday.

Reception

Critical reception

Awards 

|-
| 2000
| Shari Lewis for playing "Host" (posthumous award; accepted by Mallory Tarcher Lewis)
| Daytime Emmy Award for Outstanding Performer in a Children's Series
|

References

External links
 

1990s American children's television series
1998 American television series debuts
1999 American television series endings
American preschool education television series
American television shows featuring puppetry
American television spin-offs
1990s preschool education television series
English-language television shows
PBS Kids shows
PBS original programming
Television series about horses
Television series by Universal Television
Television shows filmed in Vancouver